Bhangar Mona is a village in Barisal District in the Barisal Division of southern-central Bangladesh.

References

Populated places in Barisal District